The women's tournament of volleyball at the 2015 Pan American Games in Toronto, Canada began on July 16 and end on July 26. All games were held at the Exhibition Centre. The United States defeated 3-0 to Brazil, who were the defending champions. American Carli Lloyd became the Most Valuable Player.

Teams

Qualification
The following nations qualified for the women's tournament:

Squads

At the start of tournament, all eight participating countries had 12 players on their rosters. Final squads for the tournament are due on June 16, 2015 a month before the start of 2015 Pan American Games. Puerto Rican player Sheilla Ocasio tested positive for Stanozolol before the bronze medal match against the Dominican Republic, lost 1-3 by her national team.

Preliminary round
All times are local Eastern Daylight Time (UTC-4)

Group A

|}

Group B

|}

Elimination round

Championship bracket

Quarterfinals

|}

Seventh place match

|}

Fifth place match

|}

Semifinals

|}

Bronze medal match

|}

Gold medal match

|}

Final standings

Awards

Most Valuable Player

Best Outside Hitters

Best Middle Blockers

Best Setter

Best Opposite

Best Scorer

Best Server

Best Libero

Best Digger

Best Receiver

Medalists

References

External links
 Competition Format and Match Schedule 
 Official website
 NORCECA

Volleyball at the 2015 Pan American Games
Pan American Games - Women
Women's events at the 2015 Pan American Games